Mahadula is a census town in Nagpur district in the Indian state of Maharashtra.

Demographics
 India census, Mahadula had a population of 18,246. Males constitute 52% of the population and females 48%. Mahadula has an average literacy rate of 76%, higher than the national average of 59.5%: male literacy is 81%, and female literacy is 71%. In Mahadula, 12% of the population is under 6 years of age.

See also
 Mahadula Municipal Council

References

Cities and towns in Nagpur district